Hae-Ja Kim de Rimasa (born 7 September 1949) is an Argentine table tennis player. She competed at the 1988 Summer Olympics and the 1992 Summer Olympics.

References

1949 births
Living people
Argentine female table tennis players
Olympic table tennis players of Argentina
Table tennis players at the 1988 Summer Olympics
Table tennis players at the 1992 Summer Olympics
Place of birth missing (living people)